Czarnominek  is a village in the administrative district of Gmina Gozdowo, within Sierpc County, Masovian Voivodeship, in east-central Poland.

References

Czarnominek